Melanohalea is a genus of foliose lichens in the family Parmeliaceae. It contains 30 mostly Northern Hemisphere species that grow on bark or on wood. The genus is characterized by the presence of pseudocyphellae, usually on warts or on the tips of isidia, a non-pored  and a medulla containing depsidones or lacking secondary compounds. Melanohalea was circumscribed in 2004 as a segregate of the morphologically similar genus Melanelia.

Taxonomy
Melanohalea was circumscribed in 2004 by lichenologists Oscar Blanco, Ana Crespo, Pradeep K. Divakar, Theodore Esslinger, David L. Hawksworth and H. Thorsten Lumbsch. It is a segregate of Melanelia, a genus created in 1978 to contain the brown Parmelia species. The circumscription of this genus was questioned later, especially after early molecular phylogenetics studies demonstrated that it was not monophyletic. Subsequently, two genera, Melanelixia and Melanohalea, were created.

Melanohalea originally contained 19 species, including the type, M. exasperata. The species transferred to Melanohalea were formerly included in section Vainioellae of genus Melanelia. This section, in turn, was derived from Parmelia subgenus Euparmelia sect. Vainioellae, originally proposed by Vilmos Gyelnik in 1932. Section Vainioellae included "brown parmelioids" with broad lobes that are round to rather elongate and more or less flat. The "brown parmelioids" refers to Parmelia species lacking atranorin or usnic acid in the cortex, but having a dark to medium-brown thallus colour. Molecular phylogenetic analysis has shown that genus Melanohalea is part of the "Melanohalea" clade, a lineage that includes most of the other "brown parmelioids". Other genera in this clade are Emodomelanelia, Melanelixia, Montanelia, and Pleurosticta.

The genus name combines Melanelia with the name of lichenologist Mason Hale, who, according to the authors, "provided the foundations for subsequent contributions to our knowledge of this family".

Diversification
Methods used to estimate the evolutionary divergence of taxa, including the multispecies coalescent process, suggest that most diversification of Melanohalea occurred throughout the Miocene (23.03 to 5.333 BP) and Pliocene (5.333 million to 2.58 BP), and divergence estimates suggest that diversification that occurred during the glacial cycles of the Pleistocene was not accompanied by speciation in Melanohalea.

Description

Melanohalea lichens have a foliose thallus that is loosely to moderately attached to its substrate. The lobes comprising the thallus are flat to concave with rounded tips, lack cilia, and measure 0.5–7 mm wide. The upper surface of the thallus is olive-green to dark brown, ranging in texture from smooth to wrinkled, and lacks spots or stains. It usually features pseudocyphellae on warts or on the tips of isidia; the presence of soredia and isidia is variable. The epicortex does not have pores, unlike the related genus Melanelixia. Cell walls contain the α-glucan compound isolichenan. The medulla is white and has a smooth and flat lower surface that is coloured pale brown to black. Rhizines are simple (i.e. unbranched).

The ascomata are apothecial, sessile to more or less pedicellate. The apothecial  is brown, and is not perforated. It is initially concave but becomes convex with age. The  (a layer of cells that surrounds the apothecium) has pseudocyphellate , without spots or stains. Asci are elongated, club-shaped (clavate), Lecanora-type, and thickened at the tip. They lack an internal apical beak, and have between 8 and 32 spores. Ascospores of Melanohalea are spherical to ovoid or ellipsoid in shape, thin-walled, colourless, and measure 5.5–20 by 4–12.5 μm. The conidiomata are pycnidial, immersed, and laminal. The shape of the conidia ranges from cylindrical to fusiform (spindle-shaped); they are simple (i.e., lacking partitions called septa), colourless, and measure 5–8.5 by 1 μm long.

Chemistry
The cortex of Melanohalea lichens have a brown pigment, but lack other compounds. The medulla contains depsidones (including fumarprotocetraric acid and norstictic acid) or lack secondary metabolites. M. nilgirica contains the aliphatic compound caperatic acid, which is rare in the brown parmelioid lichens, known only to exist in Melanelia stygia, the type species of Melanelia.

Habitat and distribution

Most Melanohalea occur primarily on bark and wood throughout the Holarctic; only four species occur in the Southern Hemisphere. The only other Melanohalea species found in a tropical habitat is M. mexicana, a highland species from south central Mexico. Eight members of the genus are found in China; seven occur in the Nordic lichen flora. The five Melanohalea species found in Greenland may play a role in monitoring the impact of climate change, as arctic-alpine lichens are sensitive to fluctuations in the temperature of winter climates, and winter icing events affect lichen-dominated ecosystems. Similarly, a study of the effect of air pollution surrounding the Mongolian capital Ulan Bator showed widespread damage to a variety of lichens (where the thallus was bleached, deformed, or reduced in size), including Melanohalea septentrionalis.

Most Melanohalea species have a broad geographic distribution, although there are a few that have more restricted ranges. Otte and colleagues suggested in a 2005 study that distribution patterns in Melanohalea are largely determined by contemporary ecogeographical factors, and most species have reached their biogeographical limits in the Northern Hemisphere. The distributions of M. elegantula and M. exasperatula seem to be affected by anthropogenic factors, including eutrophication and air pollution. Melanohalea olivacea and M. septentrionalis, both cold-tolerant circumpolar species, have the south-west limit of their distribution range in Switzerland. They are considered relicts of the last ice age and are vulnerable global climate warming in that country.

Ecology
Several species of lichenicolous fungi have been recorded growing on Melanohalea species. These include Epithamnolia xanthoriae, Xenonectriella septemseptata, Plectocarpon melanohaleae (on M. ushuaiensis), Abrothallus bertianus, Zwackhiomyces melanohaleae (on M. exasperata), Phoma melanohaleicola (on M. exasperata), Didymocyrtis consimilis, Stigmidium exasperatum (on M. exasperata), Sphaeropezia melaneliae (on M. olivacea), Arthrorhaphis olivaceae (on M. olivacea), Epithamnolia xanthoriae, Xenonectriella septemseptata, Plectocarpon melanohaleae (on M. ushuaiensis), Crittendenia coppinsii (on M. exasperatula), and Stagonospora exasperatulae (on M. exasperatula).

Conservation
Melanohalea septentrionalis is listed as endangered in the Red List of Switzerland. Although M. olivacea was left off this list over uncertainties about its taxonomic status, it has been preliminarily assessed as critically endangered in Switzerland using the IUCN Red List criteria. It has received the same assessment in the neighbouring countries Germany and France. Melanohalea halei is the only species in this genus that has been assessed for the global IUCN Red List. Because of its broad geographic distribution, breadth of ecological niches, and large, stable population size, it has been assessed as a least-concern species.

Species
Melanohalea originally included 19 species transferred from Melanelia. In the following years, new species in the genus were described from India, Tibet, Mexico, and Peru. In 2016, Leavitt and colleagues used genetic analyses to help identify 6 previously undescribed morphologically cryptic species in  Melanohalea. , Species Fungorum accepts 30 species of Melanohalea.
Melanohalea austroamericana 
Melanohalea beringiana 
Melanohalea clairi 
Melanohalea columbiana 
Melanohalea davidii 
Melanohalea elegantula 
Melanohalea exasperata 

Melanohalea exasperatula 
Melanohalea gomukhensis 
Melanohalea halei 
Melanohalea inactiva 
Melanohalea infumata 
Melanohalea laciniatula 
Melanohalea lobulata  – Tibet
Melanohalea mexicana  – Mexico
Melanohalea multispora 
Melanohalea nilgirica  – India
Melanohalea olivacea 
Melanohalea olivaceoides 
Melanohalea peruviana  – Peru
Melanohalea poeltii  – Nepal; India
Melanohalea septentrionalis  – North America; Europe; Asia
Melanohalea subelegantula  – western North America; Tibet
Melanohalea subexasperata  – Tibet
Melanohalea subolivacea 
Melanohalea subverruculifera 
Melanohalea tahltan 
Melanohalea trabeculata 
Melanohalea ushuaiensis 
Melanohalea zopheroa

References

Lecanorales genera
Lichen genera

Taxa described in 2004
Taxa named by Ana Crespo
Taxa named by Helge Thorsten Lumbsch
Taxa named by David Leslie Hawksworth
Taxa named by Pradeep Kumar Divakar